Induced-self antigen is a marker of abnormal self, which can be recognized upon infected (in particular, virus-infected) and transformed cells. Therefore, the recognition of "induced self" is an important strategy for surveillance of infection or tumor transformation - it results in elimination of the affected cells by activated NK cells or other immunological mechanisms. Similarly γδ T cells can recognize induced-self antigens expressed on cells under stress conditions.

Receptors
Probably the most studied receptor involved in recognition of induced-self antigens is NKG2D. It is an activating receptor which is expressed on NK cells and subsets of T and NKT cells. NKG2D can bind proteins at the surface of most cells that are not normally expressed, but that are expressed during a stress response of the cells (e.g. induction of the DNA damage pathway). Moreover, other recognition targets exist, for example ligands induced on human macrophages by TLR stimulation. Ligands that bind to NKG2D receptor can be divided into two families of MHC class I-related proteins: MICs (MICA, MICB) and ULBPs (ULBP1, ULBP2, ULBP3, ULBP4, RAET1G, RAET1L).

Other receptors able to bind induced-self antigens are NKG2C, NKG2E, NKG2F (CD94) or some NCRs (e.g. NKp 46 ).

Tumor targeting
Practical use of the knowledge of induced-self antigens is in targeting tumors for immune response. As tumors are very often capable of escaping the immune system by many ways, upregulation of specific ligands on the tumor cells could mount effective immune mechanisms able to eliminate these cells. For example, upregulation of NKG2D ligands can stimulate the NK cells triggering cell-mediated cytotoxicity.

References

Immunology